The 1952 Jordan League was the 8th season of Jordan League. Al-Jazeera won its first title .

Overview
Al-Jazeera won the championship.

References

RSSSF

External links
 Jordan Football Association website

Jordanian Pro League seasons
Jordan
Jordan
football